Pakri Islands are two Estonian islands in the Finnish Gulf: Suur-Pakri and Väike-Pakri ( and ). Administratively they belong to the town of Paldiski. For centuries the islands had been inhabited by Estonian Swedes, until during the Second World War the entire population was forced to leave.

Etymology
The Swedish name of the islands Rågöarna means Rye Islands - historically rye was the primary crop grown on the island. Thus Stora Rågö and Lilla Rågö mean Big Rye Island and Small Rye Island, respectively. Alternative names for the two islands are  Västra Rågö/Västerö and Östra Rågö/Österö (West Island and East Island).

In terms of area Väike-Pakri (Lesser Pakri) is actually somewhat larger than Suur-Pakri (Greater Pakri). The reason for this contradiction is probably that Suur-Pakri had more inhabitants and better farming lands and was reckoned as more important.

Geography

The islands lie a few kilometers off the Estonian coast. Väike-Pakri lies 3 km west of Paldiski, separated from it by Paldiski (Pakri) Bay, over 20 m deep. The shallow 3 km wide Kurkse strait separates the islands from the mainland in south.

The area of Väike-Pakri, the eastern island, is 12.9 km2, Suur-Pakri covers 11.6 km2 (8th and 9th largest islands in Estonia). Väike-Pakri is also higher than Suur-Pakri (17 m and 8 m, respectively). Both islands are about 6 km long (in southeast–northwest direction) and 2-2.5 km wide.

A few islets are situated in the 1-1.5 km wide and shallow (2–4 m deep) strait between the two islands. In 1952, an embankment connecting the two islands over some of the islets was built by the Soviet army.

A limestone cliff borders the northern coast of both islands and also the eastern coast of Väike-Pakri. Part of the Baltic Klint, it rises up to 4 m on Suur-Pakri and up to 13 m on Väike-Pakri. Both islands are essentially part of a larger limestone plateau in Northern Estonia.

Villages
Before the Second World War the two islands had 5 villages, three on Suur-Pakri and two on Väike-Pakri.

Suur-Pakri
Storbyn (100 inhabitants in 1935)
Strandbyn or Åsbyn (59)
Bisagidbyn (38)

Väike-Pakri
Storbyn (88)
Lillbyn (72)

History

When the people started to live in the islands, is unknown. In 1345, five Swedish families bought the western island from Padise monastery. According to the 1934 Estonian census, the islands had 354 inhabitants, all of them Swedes except for 13 Germans. There were 5 villages, a total of 119 households, a small folk museum (opened in 1935, closed in 1940) and both islands had their own church and school. Following the signing of Molotov–Ribbentrop Pact and the subsequent action of the Soviet Union (see Soviet ultimatums in 1939), in 1940 all the islanders were forced to leave - the islands were designated as a military base for the Soviet Army. Most of Pakri Swedes left for Sweden before 1944, during the German occupation of Estonia. After the Second World War Väike-Pakri had a few inhabitants until 1965. During the Soviet Era, until 1992, the islands were used as a proving ground for aerial bombardment by Warsaw Pact countries.

After control of the islands was returned to Estonia in 1994, the main aim became to clear the area of unexploded bombs. Thousands of explosive devices were destroyed and the work was mostly completed by 1997.

During the land reform following the restoration of independence in Estonia some of the land was returned to its pre-war owners. The northern parts of the islands and the southern part of Väike-Pakri were incorporated to Pakri Landscape Conservation Area, created in 1998 to protect the limestone cliffs, alvars and rare species. In 2004, the islands got their first permanent inhabitant over decades, when a person born there during the Second World War returned to rebuild his parents' farm. At the end of 2009 the islands had 6 permanent inhabitants.

Climate

See also
Kurkse tragedy

References

External links

The Pakri Islands' Development Foundation

Estonian islands in the Baltic
Landforms of Harju County
Gulf of Finland